Mesophleps mylicotis is a moth of the family Gelechiidae. It is found in Australia (South Australia).

References

Moths described in 1904
Mesophleps